Staryye Bagazy (İśke Bağaźı) is a rural locality (a village) in Karaidelsky Selsoviet, Karaidelsky District, Bashkortostan, Russia. The population was 496 as of 2010. There are 6 streets.

Geography 
Staryye Bagazy is located 9 km northwest of Karaidel (the district's administrative centre) by road. Sredniye Bagazy is the nearest rural locality.

References 

Rural localities in Karaidelsky District